Scott Andrew Munninghoff (born December 5, 1958) is an American former professional baseball pitcher, who played briefly in Major League Baseball (MLB) for the Philadelphia Phillies during the  season.
 
Munninghoff was drafted by the Phillies in the first round of the 1977 Major League Baseball Draft (22nd overall) out of Purcell Marian High School. However, he improved to 17–7 with a 2.30 ERA in 26 starts for the  Spartanburg Phillies.

He debuted with the Philadelphia Phillies on April 13, 1980, pitching two scoreless innings out of the bullpen against the Montreal Expos. On April 22, in his first and only at bat, Munninghoff hit a triple (and scored a run), joining Chuck Lindstrom (1958), Eduardo Rodríguez, and Eric Cammack as the only players to accomplish this feat in major league history.

After a poor outing against the Los Angeles Dodgers, in which he  gave up a single, wild pitch and walked two (one of which occurred with the bases loaded) Munninghoff was reassigned to the triple A Oklahoma City 89ers. In four relief appearances, Munninghoff posted a 4.50 ERA and did not have a decision or save, giving up three earned runs on eight hits and five walks while striking out two in 6.0 innings of work.

On December 9, 1981, he was sent to the Cleveland Indians in completion of an earlier deal made on November 20, 1981 in which the Phillies sent a player to be named later to the Indians; the Indians sent catcher Bo Díaz to the Phillies; the Phillies sent Lonnie Smith to the St. Louis Cardinals, and the Cardinals sent Silvio Martinez and Lary Sorensen to the Indians. He spent one season in the Indians' organization, and pitched several seasons of independent ball before becoming a coach at Purcell Marian.

As of 2010, Munninghoff owns a roofing company in Cincinnati, Ohio, where he lives with his wife and children.

See also
1980 Philadelphia Phillies season

References

External links

Scott Munninghoff at Baseball Almanac

Philadelphia Phillies players
Auburn Phillies players
Spartanburg Phillies players
Reading Phillies players
Oklahoma City 89ers players
Chattanooga Lookouts players
Charleston Charlies players
Major League Baseball pitchers
Baseball players from Ohio
1952 births
Living people